These are the official results of the Women's 200 metres event at the 2003 IAAF World Championships in Paris, France. There were a total number of 42 participating athletes, with eight qualifying heats, four quarter-finals, two semi-finals and the final held on Thursday 28 August 2003 at 21:45h.

Final

Semi-final
Held on Wednesday 27 August 2003

Quarter-finals
Held on Tuesday 26 August 2003

Heats
Held on Tuesday 26 August 2003

See also
Athletics at the 2003 Pan American Games - Women's 200 metres

References
 heats results
 quarter final results
 semi-final results
 final results

H
200 metres at the World Athletics Championships
2003 in women's athletics